The Zia Bowl was an NCAA Division II National Football Championship played at University Stadium in Albuquerque, New Mexico, in 1979 and 1980. The championship was moved to McAllen, Texas, in 1981.

Game results

References

Defunct college football bowls
Sports in Albuquerque, New Mexico
NCAA Division II Football Championship
1979 establishments in New Mexico
1980 disestablishments in New Mexico
Recurring sporting events established in 1979
Recurring sporting events disestablished in 1980
American football in New Mexico
Events in Albuquerque, New Mexico